Damien Starkey (born October 20, 1982) is an American musician, songwriter and producer. He has played many roles in several bands, served as a vocalist for Society Red and Burn Season, bassist for Puddle of Mudd, and he also owns a company called Give 2 Get Music Group in which he is a music supervisor and composer for TV and film music. Damien has scored and wrote music for more than 70 TV shows and movies including American Reunion, Nitro Circus Movie, Freeheld, Pawn Stars, Bar Rescue, and Undercover Boss. As a producer he has written for and produced many notable artists including platinum selling bands Saliva, Daughtry and Avril Lavigne. The album "Project X" by Upchurch was co-written and produced by Damien and peaked on the album chart at #4 and #2 on the Hip Hop Chart. Damien was back on tour playing bass in Saliva for most of 2018.

Biography 

Starkey was born in Cincinnati, Ohio. He moved to Jacksonville, Florida, at the age of 2, and began playing guitar at the age of 9. He started the early version of Burn Season with Bobby Amaru, vocalist of Saliva, at the age of 15. By the age of 18 they had a multimillion-dollar record deal with Elektra Records. Currently he lives in Jacksonville Beach, Florida.

From 2007 to 2011 he was songwriter and singer for Society Red, with former Puddle of Mudd rhythm guitarist Adam Latiff and former lead guitarist of Puddle of Mudd Paul Phillips. Also in the band was Brad Stewart formerly of Shinedown who now plays in Fuel. In 2010, following the departure of bassist Doug Ardito, he joined Puddle of Mudd.

Influences 
Starkey has been quoted as saying that he grew up listening to a wide variety of genres. Many artists have influenced him, such as Guns N' Roses, Metallica, Dr. Dre, and Bad Company.

Discography

Burn Season 
Burn Season (2005)
This Long Time Coming (2011)
Sleepwalker [EP] (2012)

Society Red 
Welcome To The Show (2009)

Music from the Nitro Circus Movie 
Soundtrack for Nitro Circus 3D Movie (2012)

Filmography

TV shows 
Bar Rescue (Spike TV)
Pawn Stars (History)
Worlds Worst Tenants (Spike TV)
Celebrity Wife Swap (ABC)
The Quest (Indie)
The Profit (CNBC)
60 Seconds to Sell (A&E)
Country Bucks (A&E)
Crazy Train (NBC)
ESPN College Football (ABC)
ESPN Nascar (ABC)
ESPN Winter XGames (ABC)
Jimmy Kimmel Live (ABC)
Total Divas (E!)
Strange Inheritance (FOX)
Auction Hunters (Spike TV)
Great Food Truck Race (Food Network)
Lets Ask America (ABC)
Wicked Flippah (Discovery)
Gigilos (Showtime)
Who Are You? (Nat Geographic)
Challenge Me America (FOX)
Polygamy USA (Nat Geo)
My Teen Is Pregnant and So Am I (TLC)
Honey Do (TLC)
Triggers: Weapons That Changed The World (Military Channel)
Meltdown (Nat Geo)
The Numbers Game (Nat Geo)
MMA Uncensored Live (Spike TV)
The Great Food Truck Race (Nat Geo)
Undercover Boss (CBS)

Films 
American Reunion
Nitro Circus Movie 3D
Game of Your Life
Win Win
Freeheld
Secret Wedding

References

External links 
Puddle of Mudd Official Site
Operator Official Site

1982 births
American rock bass guitarists
Living people
Musicians from Cincinnati
Guitarists from Ohio
American male bass guitarists
Puddle of Mudd members
21st-century American bass guitarists
21st-century American male musicians
Nu metal singers